The 1880 United States presidential election in Mississippi took place on November 2, 1880, as part of the 1880 United States presidential election. Mississippi voters chose eight representatives, or electors, to the Electoral College, who voted for president and vice president.

Mississippi was won by General Winfield Scott Hancock (D–Pennsylvania), running with former Representative William Hayden English, with 64.71% of the popular vote, against Representative James A. Garfield (R-Ohio), running with the 10th chairman of the New York State Republican Executive Committee Chester A. Arthur, with 29.76% of the vote and representative James B. Weaver (G–Iowa), running with Barzillai J. Chambers, a former Confederate, with 4.95% of the popular vote.

Results

References 

Mississippi
1880
1880 Mississippi elections